TTV Family is a digital television channel operated by Taiwan Television (TTV) in Taiwan, it shares channel with TTV Finance.

History
The television channel was launched on 1 June 2004.

See also
 Media of Taiwan

External links
 TTV Family official website

Television stations in Taiwan
Television channels and stations established in 2004
Taiwan Television